Lyndsay Nicholas Peter Walker (born 22 June 1974) is a former Australian cricketer who represented Nottinghamshire in English county cricket. He played as a wicket-keeper.

Walker was born in Armidale, New South Wales. He left Australia in 1992 to play in England, qualifying for Nottinghamshire by residency. Walker made his first-class debut in July 1994, in a match against the touring South Africans. He made his County Championship debut in 1996, and his limited-overs debut shortly after, in the 1996 NatWest Trophy. In the 1997–98 off-season, Walker sustained a hand injury that ended his professional playing career, despite several operations to repair it. In total, he made twelve first-class and three List A appearances for Nottinghamshire. After the end of his playing career, Walker worked as a development coach with Nottinghamshire for several years. In 2000, he took up a coaching position with the Malaysian Cricket Association, going on to coach the Malaysian national team at the 2001 ICC Trophy in Canada.

References

External links
Player profile and statistics at CricketArchive
Player profile and statistics at ESPNcricinfo

1974 births
Living people
Australian cricket coaches
Australian cricketers
Australian expatriate cricketers in the United Kingdom
Australian expatriate sportspeople in Malaysia
Australian expatriate sportspeople in England
Nottinghamshire cricketers
People from Armidale
Wicket-keepers
Cricketers from New South Wales